Robert Kehoe may refer to:

 Robert A. Kehoe (1893–1992), American toxicologist who was the chief medical consultant to Ethyl Corporation
 Bob Kehoe (1928–2017), former American soccer defender